The Bar is a river in the Ardennes department, northern France, left tributary of the river Meuse. Its source is near Buzancy, in the southern part of the Ardennes department. It flows through Brieulles-sur-Bar, Tannay, Chémery-sur-Bar and Cheveuges. It flows into the Meuse in Vrigne-Meuse, west of Sedan. For much of its length the river flows parallel to the Canal des Ardennes.

References

Rivers of France
Rivers of Grand Est
Rivers of Ardennes (department)